Gene Forrest Price is a retired United States Navy rear admiral who last served as Reserve Deputy Commander of the Naval Information Forces from 2017 to 2022, and dual-hatted as Commander of the Naval Information Force Reserve from 2017 to 2020. He served as interim Director of the National Maritime Intelligence-Integration Office and interim Commander of the Office of Naval Intelligence from January 24, 2019 to June  17, 2019 and again from May 3, 2021 to June 18, 2021.

Price earned a B.A. degree from the University of Louisville in 1980. He was commissioned as an intelligence officer in 1986. Price later received his J.D. degree from the Louis D. Brandeis School of Law at the University of Louisville in 1988.

References

External links

Year of birth missing (living people)
Living people
Place of birth missing (living people)
University of Louisville alumni
University of Louisville School of Law alumni
Kentucky lawyers
United States Navy admirals